The Lawagamau River, also known as the Kattawagami River, is a river in northern Cochrane District in Northeastern Ontario, Canada. It is part of the James Bay drainage basin, and is a right tributary of the Kesagami River.

The river begins at Upper Lawagamau Lake and heads north through Lawagamau Lake and under Ontario Highway 652. It turns northeast then east, takes in the right tributary Hopper Creek, then once again heads north. The river takes in the left tributary Hoelke Creek, and reaches its mouth at the Kesagami River. The Kesagami River flows via the Harricana River to James Bay.

Tributaries
Hoelke Creek (left)
Hopper Creek (right)

See also
List of rivers of Ontario

References

Sources

Rivers of Cochrane District